Manga, in the sense of narrative multi-panel cartoons made in Japan, originated from Euro-American-style cartoons featured in late 19th-century Japanese publications. The form of manga as speech-balloon-based comics more specifically originated from translations of American comic strips in the 1920s, with several early such manga read left-to-right and the longest-running pre-1945 manga being the Japanese translation of the American comic strip Bringing Up Father. The word manga first came into usage in the late 18th century, though it only came to refer to various forms of cartooning in the 1890s and did not become a common word until around 1920.

Historians and writers on manga history have described two broad and complementary processes shaping modern manga. Their views differ in the relative importance they attribute to the role of cultural and historical events following World War II versus the role of pre-war, Meiji, and pre-Meiji Japanese culture and art: One view, represented by other writers such as Frederik L. Schodt; Kinko Ito; and Adam L. Kern; stresses continuity of Japanese cultural and aesthetic traditions, including pre-war, Meiji, and pre-Meiji;The other view states that, during and after the occupation of Japan by the allies (1945–1952), manga was strongly shaped by the Americans' cultural influences, including comics brought to Japan by the GIs, and by images and themes from US television, film, and cartoons (especially Disney). According to Sharon Kinsella, the booming Japanese publishing industry helped create a consumer-oriented society in which publishing giants like Kodansha could shape popular taste.

Before World War II
Manga is said to originate from emakimono (scrolls), Chōjū-jinbutsu-giga, dating back to the 12th and 13th centuries. During the Edo period (1603-1867), another book of drawings, Toba Ehon, embedded the concept of manga. The word first came into common usage in the late 18th century with the publication of such works as Santō Kyōden's picturebook Shiji no yukikai (1798), and in the early 19th century with such works as Aikawa Minwa's Manga hyakujo (1814) and the celebrated Hokusai Manga books (1814–1834) containing assorted drawings from the sketchbooks of the famous ukiyo-e artist Hokusai who lived from 1760–1849. Rakuten Kitazawa (1876–1955) first used the word "manga" in the modern sense. Another example of the first half of the 19th century might be "Dehōdai mucharon"  of 1822 with prints of Hiroshige, who illustrated several books of this kind between 1820 and 1837.

Writers stress continuity of Japanese cultural and aesthetic traditions as central to the history of manga. They include Frederik L. Schodt, Kinko Ito, Adam L. Kern, and Eric Peter Nash. Schodt points to the existence in the 13th century of illustrated picture scrolls like Chōjū-jinbutsu-giga that told stories in sequential images with humor and wit. Schodt also stresses continuities of aesthetic style and vision between ukiyo-e and shunga woodblock prints and modern manga (all three fulfill Eisner's criteria for sequential art). While there are disputes over whether Chōjū-jinbutsu-giga or Shigisan-engi was the first manga, both scrolls date back to about the same time period. However, others like Isao Takahata, Studio Ghibli co-founder and director, contends there is no linkage with the scrolls and modern manga.

Schodt and Nash also see a particularly significant role for kamishibai, a form of street theater where itinerant artists displayed pictures in a lightbox while narrating the story to audiences in the street. Torrance has pointed to similarities between modern manga and the Osaka popular novel between the 1890s and 1940 and argues that the development of widespread literacy in Meiji and post-Meiji Japan helped create audiences for stories told in words and pictures. Kinko Ito also roots manga historically in aesthetic continuity with pre-Meiji art, but she sees its post-WWII history as driven in part by consumer enthusiasm for the rich imagery and narrative of the newly developing manga tradition. Ito describes how this tradition has steadily produced new genres and markets, e.g., for girls' (shōjo) manga in the late 1960s and for Ladies Comics (redisu) in the 1980s.

Even though Eastern comics are generally held separate from the evolution of Western comics and Western comic art probably originated in 17th Italy,  Kern has suggested that kibyoshi, picture books from the late 18th century, may have been the world's first comic books. These graphic narratives share with modern manga humorous, satirical, and romantic themes. Although Kern does not believe that kibyoshi were a direct forerunner of manga, for Kern the existence of kibyoshi nonetheless points to a Japanese willingness to mix words and pictures in a popular story-telling medium. The first recorded use of the term "manga" to mean "whimsical or impromptu pictures" comes from this tradition in 1798, which, Kern points out, predates Katsushika Hokusai's better known Hokusai Manga usage by several decades.

Illustrated magazines for Western expatriates introduced Western-style satirical cartoons to Japan in the late 19th century. New publications in both the Western and Japanese styles became popular. At the end of the 1890s, American-style newspaper comics supplements began to appear in Japan, as well as some American comic strips. 1900 saw the debut of the Jiji Manga in the Jiji Shinpō newspaper—the first use of the word "manga" in its modern sense, and where, in 1902, Rakuten Kitazawa began the first modern Japanese comic strip. By the 1930s, comic strips were serialized in large-circulation monthly girls' and boys' magazine and collected into hardback volumes.

Similarly, Inoue sees manga as a mixture of image- and word-centered elements, each pre-dating the Allied occupation of Japan. In his view, Japanese image-centered or "pictocentric" art ultimately derives from Japan's long history of engagement with Chinese graphic art, whereas word-centered or "logocentric" art, like the novel, was stimulated by social and economic needs of Meiji and pre-war Japanese nationalism for a populace unified by a common written language. Both fuse in what Inoue sees as a symbiosis in manga.

The roots of the wide-eyed look commonly associated with manga dates back to shōjo magazine illustrations during the late 19th to early 20th centuries. The most important illustrators associated with this style at the time were Yumeji Takehisa and particularly Jun'ichi Nakahara, who, influenced by his work as a doll creator, frequently drew female characters with big eyes in the early 20th century. This had a significant influence on early manga, particularly shōjo manga, evident in the work of influential manga artists such as Macoto Takahashi and Riyoko Ikeda.

However, other writers such as Takashi Murakami have stressed events after WWII. Still, Murakami sees Japan's surrender and the atomic bombing of Hiroshima and Nagasaki as having created long-lasting scars on the Japanese artistic psyche, which, in this view, lost its previously virile confidence in itself and sought solace in harmless and cute (kawaii) images. However, Takayumi Tatsumi sees a special role for a transpacific economic and cultural transnationalism that created a postmodern and shared international youth culture of cartooning, film, television, music, and related popular arts, which was, for Tatsumi the crucible in which modern manga have developed, along with Norakuro

For Murakami and Tatsumi, trans-nationalism (or globalization) refers specifically to the flow of cultural and subcultural material from one nation to another. In their usage, the term does not refer to international corporate expansion, nor to international tourism, nor to cross-border international personal friendships, but to ways in which artistic, aesthetic, and intellectual traditions influence each other across national boundaries. An example of cultural trans-nationalism is the creation of Star Wars films in the US, their transformation into manga by Japanese artists, and the marketing of Star Wars manga to the US. Another example is the transfer of hip-hop culture from the US to Japan. Wong also sees a major role for trans-nationalism in the recent history of manga.

Thus, these scholars see the history of manga as involving historical continuities and discontinuities between the aesthetic and cultural past as it interacts with post-WWII innovation and trans-nationalism.

After World War II 
After World War II, Japanese artists subsequently gave life to their own style during the occupation (1945–1952) and post-occupation years (1952-early 1960s), when a previously militaristic and ultranationalist Japan was rebuilding its political and economic infrastructure. Although Allied occupation censorship policies specifically prohibited art and writing that glorified war and Japanese militarism, those policies did not prevent the publication of other kinds of material, including manga. Furthermore, the 1947 Japanese Constitution (Article 21) prohibited all forms of censorship. One result was the growth of artistic creativity in this period.

In the forefront of this period are two manga series and characters that influenced much of the future history of manga. These are Osamu Tezuka's Mighty Atom (Astro Boy in the United States; begun in 1951) and Machiko Hasegawa's Sazae-san (begun in 1946).

Astro Boy was both a superpowered robot and a naive little boy. Tezuka never explained why Astro Boy had such a highly developed social conscience nor what kind of robot programming could make him so deeply affiliative. Both seem innate to Astro Boy, and represent a Japanese sociality and community-oriented masculinity differing very much from the Emperor-worship and militaristic obedience enforced during the previous period of Japanese imperialism. Astro Boy quickly became (and remains) immensely popular in Japan and elsewhere as an icon and hero of a new world of peace and the renunciation of war, as also seen in Article 9 of the Japanese constitution. Similar themes occur in Tezuka's New World and Metropolis.

By contrast, Sazae-san (meaning "Ms. Sazae") was drawn starting in 1946 by Machiko Hasegawa, a young woman artist who made her heroine a stand-in for millions of Japanese men and especially women rendered homeless by the war. Sazae-san does not face an easy or simple life, but, like Astro Boy, she too is highly affiliative and is deeply involved with her immediate and extended family. She is also a very strong character, in striking contrast to the officially sanctioned Neo-Confucianist principles of feminine meekness and obedience to the "good wife, wise mother" ideal taught by the previous military regime. Sazae-san faces the world with cheerful resilience, what Hayao Kawai calls a "woman of endurance." Sazae-san sold more than 62 million copies over the next half century.

Tezuka and Hasegawa were also both stylistic innovators. In Tezuka's "cinematographic" technique, the panels are like a motion picture that reveals details of action bordering on slow motion as well as rapid zooms from distance to close-up shots. More critically, Tezuka synchronised the placement of the panel with the reader's viewing speed to simulate moving pictures. Hence in manga production, as in film production, the person who decides the allocation of panels (Komawari) is credited as the author, while most drawings are done by assistants. This kind of visual dynamism was widely adopted by later manga artists. Hasegawa's focus on daily life and women's experience also came to characterize later shōjo manga.

Between 1950 and 1969, increasingly large audiences for manga emerged in Japan with the solidification of its two main marketing genres, shōnen manga aimed at boys and shōjo manga aimed at girls. Up to 1969, shōjo manga was drawn primarily by adult men for young female readers.

Two very popular and influential male-authored manga for girls from this period were Tezuka's 1953-1956 Ribon no Kishi (Princess Knight or Knight in Ribbons) and Mitsuteru Yokoyama 1966 Mahōtsukai Sarii (Little Witch Sally). Ribon no Kishi dealt with the adventures of Princess Sapphire of a fantasy kingdom who had been born with male and female souls, and whose sword-swinging battles and romances blurred the boundaries of otherwise rigid gender roles. Sarii, the pre-teen princess heroine of Mahōtsukai Sarii, came from her home in the magical lands to live on Earth, go to school, and perform a variety of magical good deeds for her friends and schoolmates. Yokoyama's Mahōtsukai Sarii was influenced by the US TV sitcom Bewitched, but unlike Samantha, the main character of Bewitched, a married woman with her own daughter, Sarii is a pre-teenager who faces the problems of growing up and mastering the responsibilities of forthcoming adulthood. Mahōtsukai Sarii helped create the now very popular mahō shōjo or "magical girl" subgenre of later manga. Both series were and still are very popular.

Shōjo manga 
In 1969, a group of women manga artists later called the Year 24 Group (also known as Magnificent 24s) made their shōjo manga debut (year 24 comes from the Japanese name for 1949, when many of these artists were born). The group included Hagio Moto, Riyoko Ikeda, Yumiko Ōshima, Keiko Takemiya, and Ryoko Yamagishi and they marked the first major entry of women artists into manga. Thereafter, shōjo manga would be drawn primarily by women artists for an audience of girls and young women.

In 1971, Ikeda began her immensely popular shōjo manga Berusaiyu no Bara (The Rose of Versailles), a story of Oscar François de Jarjayes, a cross-dressing woman who was a Captain in Marie Antoinette's Palace Guards in pre-Revolutionary France. In the end, Oscar dies as a revolutionary leading a charge of her troops against the Bastille. Likewise, Hagio Moto's work challenged Neo-Confucianist limits on women's roles and activities  as in her 1975 They Were Eleven, a shōjo science fiction story about a young woman cadet in a future space academy.

These women artists also created considerable stylistic innovations. In its focus on the heroine's inner experiences and feelings, shōjo manga are "picture poems" with delicate and complex designs that often eliminate panel borders completely to create prolonged, non-narrative extensions of time. All of these innovations – strong and independent female characters, intense emotionality, and complex design – remain characteristic of shōjo manga up to the present day.

Shōjo manga and Ladies' Comics from 1975 to today 
In the following decades (1975–present), shōjo manga continued to develop stylistically while simultaneously evolving different but overlapping subgenres. Major subgenres have included romance, superheroines, and "Ladies Comics" (in Japanese, redisu レディース, redikomi レディコミ, and josei 女性 じょせい), whose boundaries are sometimes indistinguishable from each other and from shōnen manga.

In modern shōjo manga romance, love is a major theme set into emotionally intense narratives of self-realization. Japanese manga/anime critic Eri Izawa defines romance as symbolizing "the emotional, the grand, the epic; the taste of heroism, fantastic adventure, and the melancholy; passionate love, personal struggle, and eternal longing" set into imaginative, individualistic, and passionate narrative frameworks. These romances are sometimes long narratives that can deal with distinguishing between false and true love, coping with sexual intercourse, and growing up in an ambivalent world, themes inherited by subsequent animated versions of the story. These "coming of age" or Bildungsroman themes occur in both shōjo and shōnen manga.

In the Bildungsroman, the protagonist must deal with adversity and conflict, and examples in shōjo manga of romantic conflict are common. They include Miwa Ueda's Peach Girl,
Fuyumi Soryo's Mars, and, for older readers, Moyoco Anno's Happy Mania, Yayoi Ogawa's Tramps Like Us, and Ai Yazawa's Nana. In another shōjo manga Bildungsroman narrative device, the young heroine is transported to an alien place or time where she meets strangers and must survive on her own (including Hagio Moto's They Were Eleven, Kyoko Hikawa's From Far Away, Yû Watase's Fushigi Yûgi: The Mysterious Play, and Chiho Saito's The World Exists For Me).

Yet another such device involves meeting unusual or strange people and beings, for example, Natsuki Takaya's Fruits Basket—one of the most popular shōjo manga in the United States—whose orphaned heroine Tohru must survive living in the woods in a house filled with people who can transform into the animals of the Chinese zodiac. In Harako Iida's Crescent Moon, heroine Mahiru meets a group of supernatural beings, finally to discover that she herself too has a supernatural ancestry when she and a young tengu demon fall in love.

With the superheroines, shōjo manga continued to break away from neo-Confucianist norms of female meekness and obedience. Naoko Takeuchi's Sailor Moon (Bishōjo Senshi Sēramūn: "Pretty Guardian Sailor Moon") is a sustained, 18-volume narrative about a group of young heroines simultaneously heroic and introspective, active and emotional, dutiful and ambitious. The combination proved extremely successful, and Sailor Moon became internationally popular in both manga and anime formats. Another example is CLAMP's Magic Knight Rayearth, whose three young heroines, Hikaru, Umi, and Fuu, are magically transported to the world of Cefiro to become armed magical warriors in the service of saving Cefiro from internal and external enemies.

The superheroine subgenre also extensively developed the notion of teams (sentai) of girls working together, like the "Sailor Senshi" in Sailor Moon, the Magic Knights in Magic Knight Rayearth, and the Mew Mew girls from Mia Ikumi's Tokyo Mew Mew. By today, the superheroine narrative template has been widely used and parodied within the shōjo manga tradition (e.g., Nao Yazawa's Wedding Peach and Hyper Rune by Tamayo Akiyama) and outside that tradition, e.g., in bishōjo comedies like Kanan's Galaxy Angel.

In the mid-1980s and after that, as girls who had read shōjo manga as teenagers matured and entered the job market, shōjo manga elaborated subgenres directed at women in their 20s and 30s. This "Ladies Comic" or redisu-josei subgenre has dealt with themes of young adulthood: jobs, the emotions and problems of sexual intercourse, and friendships or love among women.

Redisu manga retains many of the narrative stylistics of shōjo manga but has been drawn by and written for adult women. Redisu manga and art has often been, though not always, sexually explicit, but the content has characteristically been set into thematic narratives of pleasure and erotic arousal combined with emotional risk. Examples include Ryō Ramiya's Luminous Girls, Masako Watanabe's Kinpeibai and the work of Shungicu Uchida Another subgenre of shōjo-redisu manga deals with emotional and sexual relationships among women (akogare and yuri), in work by Erica Sakurazawa, Ebine Yamaji, and Chiho Saito. Other subgenres of shōjo-redisu manga have also developed, e.g., fashion (oshare) manga, like Ai Yazawa's Paradise Kiss and horror-vampire-gothic manga, like Matsuri Hino's Vampire Knight, Kaori Yuki's Cain Saga, and Mitsukazu Mihara's DOLL, which interact with street fashions, costume play ("cosplay"), J-Pop music, and goth subcultures in various ways.

By the start of the 21st century, manga for women and girls thus represented a broad spectrum of material for pre- and early teenagers to material for adult women.

Shōnen, seinen, and seijin manga 
Manga for male readers can be characterized in different ways. One is by the age of its intended audience: boys up to 18 years old (shōnen manga) and young men 18 to 30 years old (seinen manga). Another approach is by content, including action-adventure often involving male heroes, slapstick humor, themes of honor, and sometimes explicit sex. Japanese uses different kanji for two closely allied meanings of "seinen"—青年 for "youth, young man" and 成年 for "adult, majority"—the second referring to pornographic manga aimed at grown men, also called seijin ("adult," 成人) manga. Shōnen, seinen, and seijin manga share a number of features in common.

Boys and young men were among the earliest readers of manga after World War II. From the 1950s on, shōnen manga focused on topics thought to interest the archetypical boy: sci-tech subjects like robots and space travel, and heroic action-adventure. Early shōnen and seinen manga narratives often portrayed challenges to the protagonist’s abilities, skills, and maturity, stressing self-perfection, austere self-discipline, sacrifice in the cause of duty, and honorable service to society, community, family, and friends.
 
Manga with solitary costumed superheroes like Superman, Batman, and Spider-Man did not become popular as a shōnen genre. An exception is Kia Asamiya's Batman: Child of Dreams, released in the US by DC Comics and in Japan by Kodansha. However, lone antiheroes occur in Takao Saito's Golgo 13 and Koike and Kojima's Lone Wolf and Cub. Golgo 13 is about an assassin who puts his skills to the service of world peace and other social goals, and Ogami Itto, the swordsman-hero of Lone Wolf and Cub, is a widower caring for his son Daigoro while he seeks vengeance against his wife's murderers. However, Golgo and Itto remain men throughout, and neither of them ever displays superpowers. Instead, these stories "journey into the hearts and minds of men" by remaining on the plane of human psychology and motivation.

Many shōnen manga have science fiction and technology themes. Early examples in the robot subgenre included Tezuka’s Astro Boy (see above) and Fujiko F. Fujio's 1969 Doraemon, about a robot cat and the boy he lives with, which was aimed at younger boys. The robot theme evolved extensively, from Mitsuteru Yokoyama's 1956 Tetsujin 28-go to later, more complex stories where the protagonist must not only defeat enemies, but learn to master himself and cooperate with the mecha he controls. Thus, in Neon Genesis Evangelion by Yoshiyuki Sadamoto, Shinji struggles against the enemy and his father, and in Vision of Escaflowne by Katsu Aki, Van not only makes war against Dornkirk’s empire but must deal with his complex feelings for Hitomi, the heroine.

Sports themes are also popular in manga for male readers. These stories stress self-discipline, depicting not only the excitement of sports competition but also character traits the hero needs to transcend his limitations and to triumph. Examples include boxing (Tetsuya Chiba's 1968-1973 Tomorrow's Joe and Rumiko Takahashi's 1987 One-Pound Gospel) and basketball (Takehiko Inoue’s 1990 Slam Dunk).
 
Supernatural settings have been another source of action-adventure plots in shōnen and some shōjo manga in which the hero must master challenges. Sometimes the protagonist fails, as in Tsugumi Ohba and Takeshi Obata's Death Note, where protagonist Light Yagami receives a notebook from a Death God (shinigami) that kills anyone whose name is written in it, and, in a shōjo manga example, Hakase Mizuki's The Demon Ororon, whose protagonist abandons his demonic kingship of Hell to live and die on earth. Sometimes the protagonist himself is supernatural, like Kohta Hirano's Hellsing, whose vampire hero Alucard battles reborn Nazis hellbent on conquering England, but the hero may also be (or was) human, battling an ever-escalating series of supernatural enemies (Hiromu Arakawa's Fullmetal Alchemist, Nobuyuki Anzai's Flame of Recca, and Tite Kubo's Bleach).
 
Military action-adventure stories set in the modern world, for example, about WWII, remained under suspicion of glorifying Japan’s Imperial history and have not become a significant part of the shōnen manga repertoire. Nonetheless, stories about fantasy or historical military adventure were not stigmatized, and manga about heroic warriors and martial artists have been extremely popular. Some are serious dramas, like Sanpei Shirato's The Legend of Kamui and Rurouni Kenshin by Nobuhiro Watsuki, but others contain strongly humorous elements, like Akira Toriyama's Dragon Ball.

Although stories about modern war and its weapons do exist, they deal as much or more with the psychological and moral problems of war as they do with sheer shoot-'em-up adventure. Examples include Seiho Takizawa's Who Fighter, a retelling of Joseph Conrad's story Heart of Darkness about a renegade Japanese colonel set in WWII Burma, Kaiji Kawaguchi's The Silent Service, about a Japanese nuclear submarine, and Motofumi Kobayashi's Apocalypse Meow, about the Vietnam War told in talking animal format. Other battle and fight-oriented manga sometimes focus on criminal and espionage conspiracies to be overcome by the protagonist, such as in Crying Freeman by Kazuo Koike and Ryoichi Ikegami, City Hunter by Hojo Tsukasa, and the shōjo series From Eroica with Love by Yasuko Aoike, a long-running crime-espionage story combining adventure, action, and humor (and another example of how these themes occur across demographics).

For manga critics Koji Aihara and Kentaro Takekuma, such battle stories endlessly repeat the same mindless themes of violence, which they sardonically label the "Shonen Manga Plot Shish Kebob", where fights follow fights like meat skewered on a stick. Other commentators suggest that fight sequences and violence in comics serve as a social outlet for otherwise dangerous impulses. Shōnen manga and its extreme warriorship have been parodied, for example, in Mine Yoshizaki's screwball comedy Sgt. Frog (Keroro Gunso), about a platoon of slacker alien frogs who invade the Earth and end up free-loading off the Hinata family in Tokyo.

Sex and women's roles in manga for males
In early shōnen manga, men and boys played all the major roles, with women and girls having only auxiliary places as sisters, mothers, and occasionally girlfriends. Of the nine cyborgs in Shotaro Ishinomori's 1964 Cyborg 009, only one is female, and she soon vanishes from the action. Some somewhat recent shōnen manga virtually omit women, e.g., the martial arts story Baki the Grappler by Itagaki Keisuke and the supernatural fantasy Sand Land by Akira Toriyama. However, by the 1980s, girls and women began to play increasingly important roles in shōnen manga, for example, Toriyama's 1980 Dr. Slump, whose main character is the mischievous and powerful girl robot Arale Norimaki.
 
The role of girls and women in manga for male readers has evolved considerably since Arale. One class is the pretty girl (bishōjo). Sometimes the woman is unattainable, but she is generally an object of the hero's emotional and sexual interest, like Belldandy from Oh My Goddess! by Kōsuke Fujishima and Shao-lin from Guardian Angel Getten by Minene Sakurano. In other stories, the hero is surrounded by such girls and women, as in Negima by Ken Akamatsu and Hanaukyo Maid Team by Morishige. The male protagonist does not always succeed in forming a relationship with the woman, for example when Bright Honda and Aimi Komori fail to bond in Shadow Lady by Masakazu Katsura. In other cases, a successful couple's sexual activities are depicted or implied, like Outlanders by Johji Manabe. Other stories feature an initially naive hero subsequently learning how to deal and live with women emotionally and sexually, like Yota in Video Girl Ai by Masakazu Katsura, Train Man in Train Man: Densha Otoko by Hidenori Hara, and Makoto in Futari Ecchi by Katsu Aki. In erotic manga (seijin manga), often called hentai manga in the US, a sexual relationship is taken for granted and depicted explicitly, as in work by Toshiki Yui and in Were-Slut by Jiro Chiba and Slut Girl by Isutoshi. The result is a range of depictions of boys and men from naive to very sexually accustomed.

Heavily armed female warriors (sentō bishōjo) represent another class of girls and women in manga for male readers. Some sentō bishōjo are battle cyborgs, like Alita from Battle Angel Alita by Yukito Kishiro, Motoko Kusanagi from Masamune Shirow's Ghost in the Shell, and Chise from Shin Takahashi's Saikano. Others are human, like Attim M-Zak from Hiroyuki Utatane's Seraphic Feather, Johji Manabe's Karula Olzen from Drakuun, and Alita Forland (Falis) from Sekihiko Inui's Murder Princess.

As of 2013, national censorship laws and local ordinances remain in Japan. The public response to the publication of manga with sexual content or the depiction of nudity has been mixed. Series have an audience and sell well, but their publication also encounters opposition. In the early 1990s, the opposition resulted in the creation of Harmful manga lists and a shift in the publishing industry. By this time, large publishers had created a general manga demand. Still, the result is that they were also susceptible to public opinion in their markets. Faced with criticism from certain segments of the population and under pressure from industry groups to self-regulate, major publishing houses discontinued series, such as Angel and 1+2=Paradise, while smaller publication companies, not as susceptible to these forces, were able to fill the void.

With the relaxation of censorship in Japan after the early 1990s, various forms of graphically drawn sexual content appeared in manga intended for male readers that correspondingly occurred in English translations. These depictions ranged from partial to total nudity through implied and explicit sexual intercourse through sadomasochism (SM), incest, rape, and sometimes zoophilia (bestiality). In some cases, rape and lust-murder themes came to the forefront, as in Urotsukidōji by Toshio Maeda and Blue Catalyst from 1994 by Kei Taniguchi, but these extreme elements are not commonplace in either untranslated or translated manga.

Gekiga 

Gekiga literally means "drama pictures" and refers to a form of aesthetic realism in manga. Gekiga style storytelling tends to be emotionally dark, adult-oriented, and sometimes deeply violent, focusing on the day-in, day-out realities of life, often drawn in gritty fashion. Gekiga arose in the late 1950s and 1960s partly from left-wing student and working class political activism and partly from the aesthetic dissatisfaction of young manga artists like Yoshihiro Tatsumi with existing manga. Examples include Sanpei Shirato's 1959–1962 Chronicles of a Ninja's Military Accomplishments (Ninja Bugeichō), the story of Kagemaru, the leader of a peasant rebellion in the 16th century, which dealt directly with oppression and class struggle, and Hiroshi Hirata's Satsuma Gishiden, about uprisings against the Tokugawa shogunate.

Gekiga can be seen as the Japanese equivalent of the graphic novel culture happening in Europe (Hugo Pratt, Didier Comes, Jacques Tardi) and in the U.S. (Will Eisners A Contract with God, Art Spiegelmans Maus, Robert Crumbs autobiographical works) and in South America (Alberto Breccia, Hector Oesterheld). For that reason, typical graphic novel publishers such as Drawn & Quarterly and Fantagraphics started publishing many English versions of Japanese Gekiga highlights in more recent years.

As the social protest of these early years waned, gekiga shifted in meaning towards socially conscious, mature drama and towards the avant-garde. Examples include Koike and Kojima's Lone Wolf and Cub and Akira, an apocalyptic tale of motorcycle gangs, street war, and inexplicable transformations of the children of a future Tokyo. Another example is Osamu Tezuka's 1976 manga MW, a bitter story of the aftermath of the storage and possibly deliberate release of poison gas by U.S. armed forces based in Okinawa years after World War II. Gekiga and the social consciousness it embodies remain alive in modern-day manga. An example is Ikebukuro West Gate Park from 2001 by Ira Ishida and Sena Aritou, a story of street thugs, rape, and vengeance set on the social margins of the wealthy Ikebukuro district of Tokyo.

See also
 History of comics
 History of anime

Notes

References

Bibliography

External links
A History of Manga
A complete Hokusai Book, Hokusai Manga Vol 12 in Touch & Turn format
Junichi Nakahara from Shōjo Manga to Fashion (中原淳一 )
Junichi Nakahara – the godfather of manga?
Manga's story starts with kamishibai

Manga
Manga
Manga